The Crew is the debut studio album by American hardcore punk band 7 Seconds, released in 1984 by BYO Records. The original LP was released with 18 tracks, and later re-released on compact disc with six live bonus tracks.

Critical reception
The Austin Chronicle called the album a "stone classic," writing that "precious few third wave punk-hardcore outfits have aged as stoically – or as relevantly – as vox/guitar sibling duo Kevin Seconds and Steve Youth." In a retrospective review, Tiny Mix Tapes wrote that the band's sound "is distilled ... to a steady grind of too-pah beats and blender-like three-chord sounds, but it’s the combination of this minimalism and Kevin Seconds’s voice — passionate, melodic, hopeful — that makes you believe everything he says." LA Weekly placed The Crew at #3 on its list of the top twenty hardcore albums in history, writing that "7 Seconds wrote the book on positive hardcore and that book is called The Crew."

Track listing
All songs written by Kevin Seconds, except for where noted.
 "Here's Your Warning" - 1:18
 "Definite Choice" - 0:55
 "Not Just Boys Fun" (Seconds, Steve Youth) - 1:29
 "This Is the Angry Pt. 2" - 1:09
 "Straight On" - 0:24
 "You Lose" - 0:36
 "What If There's a War in America" - 0:42
 "The Crew" - 0:51
 "Clenched Fists, Black Eyes" - 1:30
 "Colourblind" - 1:42
 "Aim to Please" - 1:14
 "Boss" (Seconds, Youth) - 0:45
 "Young 'Til I Die" - 2:01
 "Red and Black" - 0:37
 "Die Hard" - 0:57
 "I Have a Dream" - 1:00
 "Bully" - 1:05
 "Trust" - 2:13
 "Here's Your Warning" (Live) - 1:35
 "Spread" (Live) - 1:21
 "I Have a Dream" (Live) - 0:58
 "Young 'Til I Die" (Live) - 1:51
 "Not Just Boys Fun" (Live) (Seconds, Youth) - 1:26
 "Rock Together" (Live) - 2:12

Personnel

Kevin Seconds: Lead Vocals 
Dan Pozniak: Guitar, Vocals 
Troy Mowat: Drums 
Steve Youth: Bass, Piano

References

1984 albums
7 Seconds (band) albums
BYO Records albums